Villares de la Reina is a municipality in the province of Salamanca,  western Spain, part of the autonomous community of Castile-Leon, on the outskirts of Salamanca city.  As of 2016 it has a population of 6,266 people.

Geography
The municipality covers an area of 22 km².

It lies 818 meters above sea level.

The postal code is 37184.

See also
List of municipalities in Salamanca

References

Municipalities in the Province of Salamanca